Zé Augusto may refer to:

 Zé Augusto (footballer, born 1959), José Augusto Borges Nascimento, Brazilian football attacking midfielder and coach
 Zé Augusto (footballer, born 1968), José Augusto Dlofo, Mozambican football defender
 Zé Augusto (footballer, born 1978), Jose Augusto Freitas Sousa, Brazilian football midfielder